The 1996 ITC Nürburgring-2 round was the eighth round of the 1996 International Touring Car Championship season. It took place on 1 September at the Nürburgring.

Alessandro Nannini won both races, driving an Alfa Romeo 155 V6 TI.

Classification

Qualifying

Race 1

Race 2

Notes:
  – Nicola Larini was given a 30-second penalty for causing a collision with Manuel Reuter.

Standings after the event

Drivers' Championship standings

Manufacturers' Championship standings

 Note: Only the top five positions are included for both sets of drivers' standings.

References

External links
Deutsche Tourenwagen Masters official website

1996 International Touring Car Championship season
Sport in Rhineland-Palatinate